The 2019 Chinese Figure Skating Championships was held on December 29 and 30, 2018 in Harbin. Medals were awarded in the disciplines of men's singles, ladies' singles, pair skating, and ice dancing. For the first time, competitors also participated in a team event, synchronized skating, and the national talent transfer, an initiative to strengthen the discipline of ice dancing.

Results

Men

Ladies

Pairs

Ice dance

Team event

Synchronized

References

Chinese Figure Skating Championships
2018 in figure skating
Chinese Figure Skating Championships, 2019
Sport in Harbin